Sutton Colliery was in the village of Stanton Hill, Nottinghamshire, England. It is now a country park.

Sutton colliery 

Sutton Colliery was known locally as "Brierley Colliery" (possibly renamed by the Staffordshire colliers who moved here from the Brierley Hill area), or the "Bread and Herring Pit" because of the poor condition of the colliery.

At the same time no.2 shaft (downcast) commenced winding from the low main seam horizon. The first coals were produced from the top hard and Dunsil seams which were worked until 1922 and 1916 respectively. The available resources of the deep hard and low main seams to the south west of the shafts were exhausted by 1943. Roy Lynk was Branch Secretary of the NUM at the pit from 1958-79. The piper and deep hard  seams becoming exhausted in 1989 when the colliery closed.

The Sutton Colliery Accident 

On 21 February 1957 an explosion occurred in the Low Main Seam.  Twenty-five men suffered multiple burns, and five men subsequently died as a result of their injuries.

Brierley Forest Park
The park has a visitor centre, fishing, football pitches, children's play areas, picnicking, cycling and horse paths, bird feeding stations, an arboretum, a remembrance grove and disabled car parking. A Parkrun takes place every Saturday morning.

Brierley Forest Park was designated a Local Nature Reserve in 2006. It contains Calcareous grassland, sown grassland, wildflower meadows with hoary ragwort, yellow-wort, wild carrot and lesser trefoil. There are four wetland feature areas, Brierley Waters, a reed swamp, Rooley Brook and the visitor centre pond. There are species rich hedgerows, woodland and semi natural vegetation.

References

External links 
 Nottinghamshire & Derbyshire Coal Fields

Coal mines in Nottinghamshire
1989 disestablishments
Underground mines in England